Chudovo is the name of several inhabited localities in Russia.

Urban localities
Chudovo, Chudovsky District, Novgorod Oblast, a town of district significance in Chudovsky District of Novgorod Oblast

Rural localities
Chudovo, Semyonov, Nizhny Novgorod Oblast, a village in Bokovskoy Selsoviet of the town of oblast significance of Semyonov,  Nizhny Novgorod Oblast
Chudovo, Koverninsky District, Nizhny Novgorod Oblast, a village in Bolshemostovsky Selsoviet of Koverninsky District of Nizhny Novgorod Oblast
Chudovo, Okulovsky District, Novgorod Oblast, a village under the administrative jurisdiction of  the urban-type settlement of Uglovka, Okulovsky District, Novgorod Oblast
Chudovo, Kalininsky District, Tver Oblast, a village in Kalininsky District of Tver Oblast
Chudovo, Staritsky District, Tver Oblast, a village in Staritsky District of Tver Oblast